The men's 1000 metres at the 1999 Asian Winter Games was held on February 1, 1999 at the Yongpyong Indoor Ice Rink, South Korea.

Schedule
All times are Korea Standard Time (UTC+09:00)

Results
Legend
DNS — Did not start
DSQ — Disqualified
q — Qualified by time

Heats

Heat 1

Heat 2

Heat 3

Heat 4

Heat 5

Quarterfinals

Heat 1

Heat 2

Heat 3

Semifinals

Heat 1

Heat 2

Finals

Final B

Final A

References

Heats
Quarterfinals
Semifinals
Finals

External links
Official website

Men 1000